Tickell is a surname. Notable people with the surname include:

Brian Tickell (born 1939), English football striker
Crispin Tickell (1930–2022), British diplomat, environmentalist and academic
Frederick Tickell (1857-1919), Australian naval officer
Jerrard Tickell (1905–1966), Irish novelist
John Tickell (born 1945), Australian doctor
Josh Tickell (born 1975), American author
Kathryn Tickell (born 1967), English piper and fiddler
Oliver Tickell (fl. 21st century), British journalist
Richard Tickell (1751–1793), English playwright
Samuel Tickell (1811–1875), British ornithologist
Thomas Tickell (1685–1740), English poet

See also
5971 Tickell, a main-belt asteroid
Tickle (disambiguation)

English toponymic surnames